Reynard Motorsport vehicles

The Reynard 2KI is an open-wheel racing car chassis designed and built by Reynard Racing Cars that competed in the 2000 IndyCar season. It was extremely competitive and dominant, winning 13 out of the 20 races that season, including the season-opener at Miami. It later won both the constructors' and drivers' titles later that year, being driven by Gil de Ferran.

References

American Championship racing cars
Reynard Motorsport vehicles